Daniel Rich (born 7 June 1990) is a professional Australian rules footballer playing for the Brisbane Lions in the Australian Football League (AFL). He was recruited with the seventh overall selection in the 2008 national draft.

Early life
Prior to being drafted by Brisbane, Rich had already amassed a considerable football résumé. This included under-18 selection for Western Australia in both 2007 and 2008, including selection for the All-Australian team both years, as well as playing in two senior premierships for Subiaco in the WAFL. Following strong performances at senior level, Rich was regarded by many observers as a potential top-two selection in the months leading up to the draft.

AFL career
Rich made an impressive senior debut in round 1, 2009 amassing 21 possession and 4 tackles, a performance which garnered him the Rising Star nomination for round 1. He was rewarded for an outstanding first-year season with the 2009 NAB Rising Star award, being only the second Rising Star winner to poll maximum votes from all 9 judges, he also created history by becoming the third consecutive player to be drafted at pick seven and win the award. The praise for Rich's debut season kept coming, this time coming from the players themselves, after winning the AFLPA award for Best First Year Player by more than 400 votes.

Following a stellar first season in 2009 which saw him win the AFL Rising Star award among other honours, Rich added bulk to his frame over the 2010 pre-season and established himself as a key component of the Lions midfield in 2010. While he was consistently among the Lions top performers in the midfield, he particularly shone in the half-back line towards the tail-end of the season in the Lions’ narrow loss to St Kilda in round 15, against Melbourne in round 18, and Essendon in round 21. He led the Lions in inside 50s (93) and was second for tackles with 103, and had an impressive average of 19 disposals per game. He finished inside the top ten in the 2010 Merrett–Murray Medal, at eighth place with 24.5 votes.

Rich played his 100th AFL game against  in round two, 2014, but suffered a season-ending ACL injury in the loss to the Gold Coast Suns the following week.

Personal life
Rich was educated in Western Australia, attending secondary schooling at Sacred Heart College, Sorrento.

Statistics
Updated to the end of the 2022 season.

|- 
| 2009 ||  || 10
| 24 || 14 || 17 || 245 || 170 || 415 || 71 || 106 || 0.6 || 0.7 || 10.2 || 7.1 || 17.3 || 3.0 || 4.4 || 6
|-
| 2010 ||  || 10
| 22 || 6 || 14 || 237 || 189 || 426 || 61 || 103 || 0.3 || 0.6 || 10.8 || 8.6 || 19.4 || 2.8 || 4.7 || 2
|-
| 2011 ||  || 10
| 16 || 14 || 12 || 198 || 109 || 307 || 42 || 76 || 0.9 || 0.8 || 12.4 || 6.8 || 19.2 || 2.6 || 4.8 || 0
|-
| 2012 ||  || 10
| 20 || 20 || 13 || 269 || 165 || 434 || 73 || 65 || 1.0 || 0.7 || 13.5 || 8.3 || 21.7 || 3.7 || 3.3 || 8
|-
| 2013 ||  || 10
| 16 || 13 || 9 || 166 || 130 || 296 || 27 || 45 || 0.8 || 0.6 || 10.4 || 8.1 || 18.5 || 1.7 || 2.8 || 5
|-
| 2014 ||  || 10
| 3 || 0 || 1 || 24 || 23 || 47 || 11 || 8 || 0 || 0.3 || 8.0 || 7.7 || 15.7 || 3.7 || 2.7 || 0
|-
| 2015 ||  || 10
| 21 || 9 || 8 || 240 || 168 || 408 || 57 || 67 || 0.4 || 0.4 || 11.4 || 8.0 || 19.4 || 2.7 || 3.2 || 3
|-
| 2016 ||  || 10
| 21 || 17 || 8 || 256 || 156 || 412 || 67 || 93 || 0.8 || 0.4 || 12.2 || 7.4 || 19.6 || 3.2 || 4.4 || 0
|-
| 2017 ||  || 10
| 22 || 8 || 11 || 322 || 147 || 469 || 81 || 35 || 0.4 || 0.5 || 14.6 || 6.7 || 21.3 || 3.7 || 1.6 || 4
|-
| 2018 ||  || 10
| 18 || 1 || 4 || 219 || 133 || 352 || 68 || 42 || 0.0 || 0.2 || 12.1 || 7.3 || 19.5 || 3.7 || 2.3 || 0
|-
| 2019 ||  || 10
| 24 || 4 || 4 || 432 || 108 || 540 || 137 || 48 || 0.1 || 0.1 || 18.0 || 4.5 || 22.5 || 5.7 || 2.0 || 0
|-
| 2020 ||  || 10
| 15 || 4 || 2 || 218 || 39 || 257 || 74 || 19 || 0.2 || 0.1 || 14.5 || 2.6 || 17.1 || 4.9 || 1.2 || 2
|- 
| 2021 ||  || 10
| 24 || 3 || 10 || bgcolor=CAE1FF | 514† || 110 || 624 || 137 || 42 || 0.1 || 0.4 || bgcolor=CAE1FF | 21.4† || 4.6 || 26.0 || 5.7 || 1.8 || 6
|-
| 2022 ||  || 10
| 22 || 1 || 3 || 404 || 104 || 508 || 99 || 35 || 0.0 || 0.1 || 18.4 || 4.7 || 23.1 || 4.5 || 1.6 || 0
|- class=sortbottom
! colspan=3 | Career
! 268 !! 114 !! 116 !! 3744 !! 1750 !! 5494 !! 1005 !! 784 !! 0.4 !! 0.4 !! 14.0 !! 6.5 !! 20.5 !! 3.8 !! 2.9 !! 36
|}

Notes

Honours and achievements
Individual
 All-Australian team: 2021
 AFL Rising Star Award: 2009
 AFLPA Best First Year Player Award: 2009
 Michael Tuck Medal: 2013
 AFL Rising Star nominee: 2009 (round 1)

References

External links

1990 births
Living people
Brisbane Lions players
Subiaco Football Club players
AFL Rising Star winners
All-Australians (AFL)
Australian rules footballers from Perth, Western Australia
People educated at Sacred Heart College, Sorrento